Arachnospila is a predominantly Holarctic genus of spider wasps, with limited representation in montane habitats
in Neotropical and Afrotropical regions.  They are found in open habitats and at forest edge, the nests may contain more than one cell.

Species

Subgenus Acanthopompilus
Arachnospila conjungens (Kohl, 1898)
Arachnospila alpivaga (Kohl, 1888)
Arachnospila nuda (Tournier, 1890)

Subgenus Ammosphex
Arachnospila abnormis (Dahlbom, 1842)
Arachnospila alvarabnormis (Wolf, 1965)
Arachnospila anceps (Wesmael, 1851))
Arachnospila apennines (Wolf, 1964)
Arachnospila colpostoma (Kohl, 1886)
Arachnospila consobrina (Dahlbom, 1843)
Arachnospila dakota (Cresson 1867)
Arachnospila gibbomima (Main, 1929)
Arachnospila hedickei (Main, 1929)
Arachnospila imbecillus (Banks 1939)
Arachnospila luctuosa (Cresson 1865)
Arachnospila michiganensis (Driesbach 1949)
Arachnospila nivalabnormis (Wolf, 1965)
Arachnospila occidentalis (Driesbach 1949)
Arachnospila ofa (Tournier, 1890)
Arachnospila opinata (Tournier, 1890)
Arachnospila parvula (Banks, 1912)
Arachnospila rhaetabnormis (Wolf, 1965)
Arachnospila silvana (Kohl, 1886)
Arachnospila solona (Banks, 1913)
Arachnospila trivialis (Dahlbom, 1843)
Arachnospila wasbaueri (Eavns, 1966)
Arachnospila valesabnormis (Wolf, 1965)
Arachnospila virgilabnormis Wolf, 1976
Arachnospila wesmaeli (Thomson, 1870)
Arachnospila westerlundi (Morawitz, 1893)

Subgenus Anoplochares
Arachnospila asiatica (Morawitz, 1888)
Arachnospila canariensis Wolf, 1978
Arachnospila fuscomarginata (Thomson, 1870)
Arachnospila minutula (Dahlbom, 1842)
Arachnospila spissa (Schiodte, 1837)

Subgenus Arachnospila
Arachnospila arcta (Cresson 1865)
Arachnospila brevispinis Wahis, 1992
Arachnospila fumipennis (Zetterstedt, 1838)
Arachnospila ionica Wolf, 1964
Arachnospila longifrons Wolf, 1990
Arachnospila rufa (Haupt, 1927)
Arachnospila sogdianoides (Wolf, 1964)

Subgenus Melanospila
Arachnospila esau (Kohl, 1886)
Arachnospila holomelas (Costa, 1882)
Arachnospila tyrrhena Wahis, 1982

References

Hymenoptera genera
Pompilinae
Taxa named by Trevor Kincaid